CDM may refer to:

Organizations
 College of Dental Medicine, US dental schools
 DePaul University College of Computing and Digital Media, in Chicago, Illinois, US
 Corona del Mar High School, a high school located in Newport Beach, California, US

Science and technology
 Cash deposit machine, in banks
 Clean Development Mechanism, a mechanism in the Kyoto Protocol for reducing emissions
 Ceramic metal-halide lamp, a lamp/light source
 Charged-device model, used in electrostatic discharge testing
 Clinical data management
 Code division multiplexing
 Cold dark matter, a scientific theory
 Combining Diacritical Marks, for keyboards
 Combustion detection module
 Common Diagnostic Model, a standard of the Distributed Management Task Force
 Conceptual data model
 Content Decryption Module
 Customer data management, software and behaviors for businesses to handle customer data
 Continuous Diagnostics and Mitigation, a program of the Department of Homeland Security; see Federal Systems Integration and Management Center
 Congenital dermal melanocytosis, a benign birthmark

Transport
 Chidambaram railway station, Cuddalore, Tamil Nadu, India (Indian Railways station code)

Other uses
 Celebrity Deathmatch, a claymation TV series
 CD maxi, a maxi single
 Charge description master, a comprehensive price list of items billable to patients in a US hospital
 Construction (Design and Management)
 Construction (Design and Management) Regulations 2007, UK construction regulations
 Construction (Design and Management) Regulations 2015, UK construction regulations
 Corona del Mar, Newport Beach, a beach and community in California, US

 Clergy Discipline Measure 2003, a legal measure in the Church of England
 Central defensive midfielder, a position in association football

See also
 Lambda-CDM model or ΛCDM model, standard cosmological model of the universe